Korah Collegiate and Vocational School is a public secondary school located on Goulais Avenue in Sault Ste. Marie. It was established in 1967 by the Algoma District School Board. It holds both a 9 to 12 secondary program and a smaller 7/8 intermediate program. It primarily services students in the west end of the city, as well as other parts of the Algoma District including Prince.

Notable alumni
Crystal Shawanda - Canadian country music singer
 Kelly Weeks, Crown Attorney

See also
List of high schools in Ontario

External links
 http://www.korahcvs.com

High schools in Sault Ste. Marie, Ontario
1967 establishments in Ontario
Educational institutions established in 1967